is a Japanese footballer who plays as a right back for  club Shimizu S-Pulse.

Career statistics

Club
.

References

External links
Profile at Shimizu S-Pulse
Profile at Yokohama FC
Profile at JEF United Chiba

1992 births
Living people
Senshu University alumni
Association football people from Gunma Prefecture
Japanese footballers
J1 League players
J2 League players
JEF United Chiba players
Yokohama FC players
Kashiwa Reysol players
Shimizu S-Pulse players
Association football fullbacks
Universiade bronze medalists for Japan
Universiade medalists in football
Medalists at the 2013 Summer Universiade